Parna may refer to:

 Parna (geology), a type of windblown sediment
 Parna (genus), a genus of insect
 Pärna, a village in Hiiu County, northwestern Estonia
 Pärna, Lääne-Viru County, a village in northeastern Estonia
 Ibnu Parna (died 1965), an Indonesian politician and trade unionist

See also
 
Parnas (disambiguation)